Nir Poraz (14 May 1971 – 14 October 1994) (Hebrew: ניר פורז) was an Israeli Defence Forces Captain who was killed in action by Hamas during the failed October 14, 1994 rescue mission for IDF soldier Nachshon Wachsman in Bir Nabbalah. The rescue operation was authorized by then Israeli Prime Minister Yitzhak Rabin. Poraz was killed by close range automatic fire from a distance of three yards. He was 23 years old.

Author Ami Pedahzur writes in his book The Israeli Secret Services and the Struggle Against Terrorism that in addition to the deaths of Wachsman and Poraz "ten officers and enlisted men had been wounded." Three Hamas gunmen were also killed.

Poraz, along with Capt. Lior Lotan, was one of the mission commanders of the Sayeret Matkal team which had been assigned the task to rescue Wachsman. Poraz and Wachsman had never met.

Many similarities have been drawn between Israel's different response to the kidnapping of Wachsman and to the 2006 kidnapping of Cpl. Gilad Shalit.

Poraz's mother, Mati, when interviewed by the Israeli news source ynet said, "I can only hope that there will be no rescue operation; that it will end in diplomatic manners."

In addition to his mother, Nir is survived by his two sisters Tamar and Amit.

When he was two years old, Nir's father was killed in the 1973 Yom Kippur War during the battle for the Suez Canal. Nir's name is frequently evoked in speeches at memorial services to Yitzhak Rabin and Nahshon Wachsman.

Nir's military funeral took place in Kfar Sha'ul on the Sunday afternoon following his death. At the request of Nir's mother, Rabbi Mordechai Elon of Yeshivat HaKotel delivered a eulogy devoid of politics.

Nir Poraz's name has also been given to a recent Israeli medical discovery NIR.

An annual duathalon is named after him in Ramat HaSharon.

References

External links
Text to display

1971 births
1994 deaths
Israeli soldiers
Israeli military personnel killed in action
Burials at Kiryat Shaul Cemetery